Benson Hollow is a tributary of Bowman Creek in Wyoming County, Pennsylvania, in the United States. Benson Hollow is a first-order stream and is not designated as an impaired waterbody. The surficial geology in its vicinity consists of Wisconsinan Outwash, alluvium, Wisconsinan Till, bedrock, and a lake. The stream's watershed is designated as a High-Quality Coldwater Fishery and a Migratory Fishery.

Course

Benson Hollow begins in a valley to the west of Cedar Ledge in Eaton Township. It flows south-southeast for a few tenths of a mile before turning east-southeast. Several tenths of a mile further downstream, the stream reaches its confluence with Bowman Creek.

Hydrology
Benson Hollow is not designated as an impaired waterbody.

Geography and geology

During the Ice Age, glacial meltwater from Benson Hollow helped form a delta in the valley of Bowman Creek. There is a "deeply notched" col at the stream's headwaters.

The stream is a Rosgen C Type stream and does not have large loads of debris. The surficial geology along the lower reaches of the stream, but alluvium and a lake occur in the upper reaches. The stream's valley is flanked by Wisconsinan Till and bedrock consisting of sandstone and shale.

Watershed
The stream is entirely in the United States Geological Survey quadrangle of Tunkhannock.

Benson Hollow is a first-order stream.

A single-barrel culvert carries Benson Hollow in one reach. The culvert passes a 25-year maximum design flow. Areas of deposition occur upstream of the culvert and a large scour pool occurs downstream of it. These phenomena are typical of such culverts.

History
Benson Hollow does not have a name of its own, but takes its name from the valley through which it flows. The stream's valley was entered into the Geographic Names Information System on August 2, 1979. Its identifier in the Geographic Names Information System is 1169270.

Biology
The drainage basin of Benson Hollow is designated as a High-Quality Coldwater Fishery and a Migratory Fishery. Wild trout naturally reproduce in the stream from its headwaters downstream to its mouth.

See also
Sugar Hollow Creek, next tributary of Bowman Creek going upstream
List of rivers of Pennsylvania
List of tributaries of Bowman Creek

References

Rivers of Wyoming County, Pennsylvania
Tributaries of Bowman Creek
Rivers of Pennsylvania